The 2023 United States state legislative elections will be held on November 7, 2023, for eight state legislative chambers in four states. These off-year elections will coincide with other state and local elections, including gubernatorial elections in three states.

The Democratic Party gained one seat in the Virginia Senate through a special election on January 10. Further special elections on February 7 gave Democrats control of the Pennsylvania House of Representatives. Democrats had won control of the chamber in 2022, but vacancies prevented them from seating it until after the special elections.

Summary table 
Regularly-scheduled elections will be held in 8 of the 99 state legislative chambers in the United States. Nationwide, regularly-scheduled elections will be held for 578 of the 7,383 legislative seats. This table only covers regularly-scheduled elections; additional special elections may take place concurrently with these regularly-scheduled elections.

State summaries

Louisiana 

All seats of the Louisiana State Senate and the Louisiana House of Representatives are up for election to four-year terms in 2023. Republicans currently control both chambers.

Mississippi 

All seats of the Mississippi State Senate and the Mississippi House of Representatives are up for election to four-year terms in 2023. Republicans currently control both chambers.

New Jersey 

All seats of the New Jersey Senate and the New Jersey General Assembly are up for election. In 2023, senators will be elected to four-year terms in single-member districts, while Assembly members will be elected to two-year terms in two-member districts. Democrats currently control both chambers.

Virginia 

All seats of the Virginia Senate and the Virginia House of Delegates are up for election in 2023. Senators will be elected to four-year terms, while delegates serve terms of two years. Democrats currently control the upper house, whereas Republicans hold a majority in the lower house.

Special elections
There are currently thirty-two state legislative special elections scheduled for 2023.

Connecticut

Florida

Georgia

Kentucky

Louisiana

Maine

Massachusetts

Mississippi

New Hampshire

Pennsylvania

South Carolina

Tennessee

Virginia

Wisconsin

Notes

References 

 
 
State legislative elections
State legislature elections in the United States by year